Steve McNicholas  (born 11 August 1955) is an English director, composer, actor and co-founder of dance percussion act Stomp. 

McNicholas has worked with Cliff Hanger Theatre Co., 7:84, Covent Garden Community Theatre, Pookiesnackenburger Buskers and the Flying Pickets. His work in television includes Rowan Atkinson's Mr. Bean, various soundtrack work with Luke Cresswell and the Yes/No video percussion series for ITV as director. He composed the score of the 1997 film Riot, and shares directorial credits with Cresswell on STOMP-based short films and commercials. He co-wrote and co-directed the 2002 Imax movie Pulse: A Stomp Odyssey and the 3D movie Wild Ocean. Composed and co-directed Pandemonium: the Lost and Found Orchestra.

References

External links
 
 Steve McNicholas at the Internet off-Broadway Database

1955 births
Place of birth missing (living people)
Living people
English male stage actors
English buskers
English choreographers
English male dancers
English film directors
English theatre directors
Laurence Olivier Award winners